The wompoo fruit dove (Ptilinopus magnificus), also known as wompoo pigeon, is one of the larger fruit doves native to New Guinea and eastern Australia.

Taxonomy and systematics

Subspecies 
There are generally 7-8 recognised subspecies, although some authorities recognise as few as 5.

 P. m. magnificus – Temminck, 1827:
 P. m. keri – :
 P. m. alaris – :
 P. m. assimilis – :
 P. m. poliura – :
 P. m. interposita – :
 P. m. septentrionalis – :
 P. m. puella – :

Description

It has purple plumage around its neck, chest and upper belly. Its lower belly is yellow and it has green underparts. The sexes are similar and the juveniles have a duller and greener plumage compared to adults. Notwithstanding their bright plumage, they are hard to see amongst the forest canopy, thanks to their unobtrusive, quiet habits. Their call sounds like wollack-wa-hoo and often sounds very human.

Behaviour

Food
The wompoo fruit dove can be seen in large flocks where food is abundant. The birds feed off fruit-bearing trees in rainforests such as figs. They also occasionally eat insects. They can eat large fruits whole and are able to acrobatically collect fruit of trees and vines. They do not like to travel long distances, preferring to stay in their local area and make use of whatever fruit are in season. The diet of this species was extensively studied in the Port Moresby area by Frith et al. (1976).

Major food items included:
 figs, particularly Ficus macrophylla, including Ficus albipila, Ficus benjamina, Ficus drupacea, Ficus glaberrima, Ficus virens and Ficus wassa - preferentially in the late dry and wet season (October - March)
 Fruit of cinnamon trees (Cinnamomum sp.), Litsea, Neolitsea and Cryptocarya - whenever available
 Arecaceae (palm) fruit, including Archontophoenix, Arenga, Calamus and Caryota - mid-late dry season (August - October) and January
 Annonaceae fruit, such as Ylang-ylang (Cananga odorata) and Polyalthia - whenever available
Food items of minor importance were fruit of:
 Eugenia, Syzygium, Acmena - important in May
 Hypserpa - important in July/August
 Planchonella - important August - October
 Elaeocarpus - important in October
 Erythroxylon scarinatum - important in November/December
 Tinospora smilacina, Glochidion, Gomphandra australiana, Gomphandra montana, Cayratia, Cissus, Terminalia, Diospyros, Chionanthus, Vitex cofassus, Alocasia, and Psychotria - taken as available

Breeding

Breeding times will vary according to weather conditions. The nest is sturdily constructed from forked twigs not high from the ground. Both sexes help in the construction of the nest. One white egg is laid and the parents share the incubation and care of the chick. In the event that the chick dies, the doves will attempt to have a second offspring in the same season.

Conservation
Widespread and common throughout its large range, the wompoo fruit dove is evaluated as Least Concern on the IUCN Red List of Threatened Species.

References

External links 

 
 
 

wompoo fruit dove
Birds of New Guinea
Birds of Queensland
wompoo fruit dove
Articles containing video clips
Taxobox binomials not recognized by IUCN